Jelani Akil Smith (born January 1, 1991) is former footballer who serves as team manager of Forge FC. Born in Canada, he represented Guyana at international level.

Club career 
Smith began playing football at the youth level with the Ontario U-16 Provincial team, and at the National Training Center. In 2007, he became one of the youngest players to play in the Canadian Soccer League with the Canadian Lions. The following season he was transferred to the Italia Shooters, where he clinched the International Division title. In 2009, he pursued College soccer by enrolling with Florida Gulf Coast Eagles, and during the off season he played in the USL Premier Development League with the Toronto Lynx for two seasons.

In 2013, he went abroad to sign with Sturm Graz, where he mostly featured in the Regionalliga Mitte. In 2016, he played in the Niedersachsenliga with SSV Jeddeloh, and returned to Canada to play with Sigma FC in League1 Ontario.

International career 
On May 25, 2010, he was called to a Canada U-20 camp in Netherlands by head coach Valerio Gazzola.  Smith made his international debut for the Guyana national football team on November 14, 2017 in a friendly match against Trinidad and Tobago.

Managerial career
Initially brought on as a player for Canadian Premier League side Forge FC, Smith was instead signed as the club's team manager.

Personal
He is the younger brother of Jamaal Smith, who was also a soccer player for Guyana.

References 

1991 births
Living people
Association football defenders
Canadian soccer players
Guyanese footballers
Soccer players from Mississauga
Canadian sportspeople of Guyanese descent
Black Canadian soccer players
Florida Gulf Coast Eagles men's soccer players
Brampton United players
York Region Shooters players
Toronto Lynx players
Canadian Soccer League (1998–present) players
USL League Two players
Austrian Regionalliga players
Oberliga (football) players
League1 Ontario players
Guyana international footballers
Forge FC non-playing staff
Sigma FC players
Canadian expatriate soccer players
Guyanese expatriate footballers
Expatriate soccer players in the United States
Canadian expatriate sportspeople in the United States
Expatriate footballers in Austria
Canadian expatriate sportspeople in Austria
Expatriate footballers in Germany
Canadian expatriate sportspeople in Germany